The 2010–11 New Zealand Figure Skating Championships was held at the Dunedin Ice Stadium in Dunedin from 3 through 8 October 2010. Skaters competed in the disciplines of men's singles, ladies' singles, pair skating, and synchronized skating across many levels, including senior, junior, novice, adult, and the pre-novice disciplines of juvenile, pre-primary, primary, and intermediate.

Senior results

Men

Ladies

Pairs

Synchronized

External links
 2010–11 New Zealand Figure Skating Championships results

2010 in figure skating
2010
Figure Skating Championships 2010-11
Figure Skating Championships 2010-11